Ronald Joseph Pearsall (20 October 1927 – 27 September 2005) was an English writer whose scope included children's stories, pornography and fishing.

His most famous book The Worm in the Bud (1969) was about Victorian sexuality, including orgies, prostitution and fetishism. A prolific writer, his other books included three on popular music between 1837 and 1929, several on the history of sexuality and many on antiques. He held other jobs as a shoe shop assistant, cinema manager and store detective. His book The Table Rappers (1972) was an exposure of fraud mediums, tricksters and charlatans in Spiritualism.

Bibliography
1966: Is That My Hook in Your Ear? a light-hearted look at angling. London: Stanley Paul
1969: The Worm in the Bud: the world of Victorian sexuality. London: Weidenfeld and Nicolson 
1972: The Exorcism. London: Sphere Books  (a novel)
1972: The Possessed. London: Sphere Books  (a novel)
1972: The Table-rappers. London: Michael Joseph 
1972: Victorian Sheet Music Covers. Newton Abbot: David & Charles 
1973: Collecting Mechanical Antiques. Newton Abbot: David & Charles 
1973: Edwardian Life and Leisure. Newton Abbot: David & Charles 
1973: Victorian Popular Music. Newton Abbot: David & Charles 
1974: Collecting and Restoring Scientific Instruments. Newton Abbot: David & Charles 
1974: Inside the Antique Trade/ Shaldon: Keith Reid  (with Graham Webb)
1975: Collapse of Stout Party: Victorian wit and humour. London: Weidenfeld and Nicolson 
1975: Edwardian Popular Music. Newton Abbot: David & Charles 
1975: Night's Black Angels: the forms and faces of Victorian cruelty. London : Hodder and Stoughton 
1976: The Alchemists. London: Weidenfeld and Nicolson 
1976: The Belvedere. London: Weidenfeld and Nicolson  (a novel)
1976: Popular Music of the Twenties. Newton Abbot: David & Charles 
1976: Public Purity, Private Shame: Victorian sexual hypocrisy exposed. London: Weidenfeld and Nicolson 
1977: Conan Doyle: a biographical solution. London: Weidenfeld and Nicolson 
1978: Tides of War. London: Michael Joseph  (a novel)
1979: The Iron Sleep. London: Michael Joseph  (a novel about the first World War)
1981: Tell me, Pretty Maiden: the Victorian and Edwardian nude. Exeter: Webb & Bower 
1986: Making and Managing an Antique Shop.Newton Abbot: David & Charles 
1988: The Joy of Antiques. Newton Abbot: David & Charles 
1989: Sherlock Holmes Investigates the Murder in Euston Square. Newton Abbot: David & Charles 
1990: Antique Furniture for Pleasure and Profit. Newton Abbot: David & Charles 
1991: The David & Charles Encyclopedia of Everyday Antiques. Newton Abbot: David & Charles 
1991: Lifesaving: the story of the Royal Life Saving Society; the first 100 years. Newton Abbot: David & Charles 
1991: Painting Abstract Pictures. Newton Abbot: David & Charles 
1992: Antique Furniture Almanac . Moffat: Lochar 
1996: Illustrated Guide to Collecting Antiques. New York: Todtri 
1996: Lost at Sea: great shipwrecks of history.  New York: Todtri 
1996: Painting Course: introduction to drawing: watercolour, gouache and tempera: pastel and acrylic: oil painting. London: Chancellor  (originally published in four separate vols. London: Trodd, 1990)
1997: A Connoisseur's Guide to Antique Clocks & Watches. New York: Todtri 
1997: A Connoisseur's Guide to Antique Furniture. New York: Smithmark 
1997: A Connoisseur's Guide to Antique Pottery & Porcelain. New York: Smithmark 
1997: A Connoisseur's Guide to Antique Silver. New York: Smithmark 
1998: Myths and Legends of Ireland. New York: Todtri 
1999: A Connoisseur's Guide to Antique Dolls. New York: Todtri 
1999: A Connoisseur's Guide to Antique Jewellery. New York: Todtri 
1999: A Connoisseur's Guide to Antique Toys. New York: Todtri 
1999: Kings & Queens : a history of British monarchy. New York: Todtri 
1999: Mysterious Places of the World. New York: Todtri 
1999: The Romance of Travel. New York: Todtri 
2000: A Connoisseur's Guide to Antique Glass. New York: Todtri 

As editor
1972: A Secret Diary: the intimate memoirs of Vicar Veitch. London: David Bruce & Watson

References 

1927 births
2005 deaths
20th-century English male writers
Critics of parapsychology
Critics of Spiritualism
English children's writers
English male non-fiction writers
English non-fiction writers